Conus angeluquei is a species of sea snail, a marine gastropod mollusk, in the family Conidae, the cone snails and their allies.

Description
The length of the shell of the holotype is 24.8 mm.

Distribution
This marine species occurs off the Cape Verdes.

References

Identification of new species of Kalloconus and Africonus (Gastropoda, Conidae) from the Cabo Verde Islands through mitochondrial genome comparison. The Festivus 50(2): 73-88

angeluquei